Cross House may refer to:


Places and structures

United Kingdom
 Cross House, Linlithgow, a Category A listed building in West Lothian, Scotland
 Cross House, Southampton, a Grade II listed building in Southampton
 Cross House, Tewkesbury, a Grade II* listed building in the Borough of Tewkesbury

United States
 T. D. Cross House, Safford, Arizona, listed on the NRHP in Graham County, Arizona
 Cross House (Beebe, Arkansas), NRHP-listed
 Williams House (Odessa, Delaware), also known as Cross House, NRHP-listed
 Col. H.C. and Susan Cross House, Emporia, Kansas, listed on the NRHP in Lyon County, Kansas
 Cross Manor, St. Inigoes, Maryland, NRHP-listed
 Hamilton Cross House, Stillwater, Oklahoma, listed on the NRHP in Payne County, Oklahoma
 Harvey Cross House, Oregon City, Oregon, NRHP-listed
 Curtis Cross House, Salem, Oregon, NRHP-listed
 Orndoff-Cross House, Martinsburg, West Virginia, NRHP-listed

See also
 Cross Houses